The 2023 Purdue Boilermakers football team will represent Purdue University in the West Division of the Big Ten Conference during the 2023 NCAA Division I FBS football season. The team will be led by Ryan Walters in his first year as head coach. The Boilermakers will their play home games at Ross–Ade Stadium in West Lafayette, Indiana.

Previous season

The Boilermakers finished the 2022 season 8–4, 6–3 in Big Ten play to win the West division. As a result, they received a bid to the Big Ten championship game for the first time in program history. There they lost to Michigan. They received a bid to the Citrus Bowl where they lost to LSU.

On December 7, 2022 head coach Jeff Brohm accepted the head coach position at his alma mater Louisville. His brother and Purdue offensive coordinator Brian Brohm served as interim head coach for the Boilermakers during the Citrus Bowl. on December 13, 2022, the school named former Illinois defensive coordinator Ryan Walters the team's new head coach. Walters will be the fourth youngest head football coach at the NCAA Division I FBS level.

Schedule

Roster

References

Purdue
Purdue Boilermakers football seasons
Purdue Boilermakers football